Raspay is a village in the municipality of Yecla, eastern Spain. Its population consisted of 100 inhabitants in the year 2017.

Geography
The village is located in the foothill Sierra de las Pansas of the mountain range Sierra del Carche.

History
The first document referencing the village is from 1855. In that year, Antonio Ibáñez was given control of the rectory in Raspay and became the first priest of this territory.

Since 2005, courses to boost the Catalan language in the village and in other adjacent towns of the Catalan-speaking region of Carche are being promoted.

Demographics 
1/3 inhabitants are foreigners and they all come from other countries of Europe. 2/3 inhabitants are older than 60 years and 7.07% locals are younger than 15 years old, this is a percentage which is approximately 0.37% lower than the half of the proportion of people with same conditions nationwide.

References

Populated places in the Region of Murcia
Towns in Spain